Krzysztof Jeżowski (born 30 August 1975) is a former Polish racing cyclist.

Palmares

1998
1st Stages 6, 7 & 10 Tour of Greece
2001
1st Stage 5 Dookoła Mazowsza
3rd Memoriał Henryka Łasaka
2002
2nd National Road Race Championships
2004
1st Stage 11 Tour du Maroc
1st Stage 4 Course de la Solidarité Olympique
1st Stages 2 & 3 Tour of Małopolska
3rd National Road Race Championships
3rd Dookoła Mazowsza
2005
1st Stage 5 Dookoła Mazowsza
2006
1st Stages 3 & 4 Szlakiem Grodów Piastowskich
1st Pomerania Tour
1st Stages 1 & 4 Dookoła Mazowsza
2nd Neuseen Classics
2007
1st Memoriał Henryka Łasaka
1st Stage 3 Bałtyk–Karkonosze Tour
1st Stage 2 Tour of Małopolska
2008
1st Memoriał Henryka Łasaka
1st Stage 4 Tour de Taiwan
1st Stage 3 Szlakiem Grodów Piastowskich
1st Stage 2 Tour of Małopolska
2009
 National Road Race Champion
1st Tour de Taiwan
1st Stages 3 & 6
1st Stages 1, 6, 9 & 10 Tour du Maroc
1st Stage 2 Tour of Małopolska
1st Stage 4 Dookoła Mazowsza
2nd Memoriał Henryka Łasaka
2010
3rd Memoriał Andrzeja Trochanowskiego
2011
2nd Memoriał Andrzeja Trochanowskiego
3rd Dookoła Mazowsza

References

1975 births
Living people
Polish male cyclists
People from Pabianice
Sportspeople from Łódź Voivodeship